André Filipe Neves Pereira Pinto Carvalho (born 12 March 1985) is a Portuguese footballer who played as a midfielder.

References

1985 births
Living people
People from Vila do Conde
Portuguese footballers
Portugal youth international footballers
Association football midfielders
FC Porto B players
C.D. Aves players
Varzim S.C. players
Leixões S.C. players
F.C. Famalicão players
G.D. Joane players
F.C. Tirsense players
A.D. Esposende players
Sportspeople from Porto District